The Buncombe County Democratic Party (BCDP) is the Buncombe County affiliate of the  NC Democratic Party in the United States. It is headquartered in Asheville.

History

In 1920, the BCDP elected Lillian Exum Clement, the first woman to serve in any state legislature in the Southern United States.

Elected officials

Council of State
Josh Stein
Elaine Marshall
Beth Wood

NC General Assembly
Terry Van Duyn
Susan Fisher
John Ager
Brian Turner

Asheville City Council
Esther Manheimer
Gwen Wisler
Julie Mayfield
Gordon Smith
Keith Young

Related Links
Buncombe Young Democrats Website

See also
North Carolina Democratic Party
Buncombe County, North Carolina

References

Buncombe County, North Carolina
North Carolina Democratic Party